Charles Buller (6 August 1806 – 29 November 1848) was a British barrister, politician and reformer.

Background and education
Born in Calcutta, British India, Buller was the son of Charles Buller (1774–1848), a member of a well-known Cornish family, and Barbara Isabella Kirkpatrick, daughter of General William Kirkpatrick, considered an exceptionally talented woman. His younger brother was Sir Arthur William Buller. He was educated at Harrow, then privately in Edinburgh by Thomas Carlyle, and afterwards at Trinity College, Cambridge, gaining his BA in 1828. He had been admitted to Lincoln's Inn in 1824, and became a barrister in 1831.

Political career
Before this date, however, Buller had succeeded his father as Member of Parliament for West Looe. After the passing of the Reform Bill of 1832 and the consequent disenfranchisement of this borough, he was returned to Parliament for Liskeard, a seat he retained until he died.

An eager reformer and a friend of John Stuart Mill, Buller voted for the Great Reform Bill, favoured other progressive measures, and presided over the committee on the state of the records and the one appointed to inquire into the state of election law in Ireland in 1836. In the aftermath of the Rebellions of 1837, he went to Canada in 1838 with Lord Durham as private secretary, and served in the second session of the Special Council of Lower Canada. For a long time it was believed that Buller wrote Lord Durham's famous Report on the Affairs of British North America. However, this is now denied by several authorities, among them being Durham's biographer, Stuart J Reid, who mentions that Buller described this statement as a groundless assertion in an article which he wrote for the Edinburgh Review. Nevertheless, it is quite possible that the Report was largely drafted by Buller, and it almost certainly bears traces of his influence. He also wrote A Sketch of Lord Durham's mission to Canada, which was never printed. He returned with Durham to England in the same year. Buller and Sir William Molesworth were associated with Edward Gibbon Wakefield and his schemes for colonising South Australia, Canada and New Zealand.

Buller was briefly Secretary to the Board of Control under Lord Melbourne during 1841. After practising as a barrister, he was made Judge Advocate General by Lord John Russell in 1846, and became the first President of the Poor Law Board the following year.

Personal life
Buller died in office in London in November 1848, aged 42. He never married. He was considered a very talented man, witty, popular and generous, and is described by Carlyle as "the genialest radical I have ever met". Among his intimate friends were Grote, Thackeray, Monckton Milnes and Lady Ashburton. A bust of Buller is in Westminster Abbey, and another was unveiled at Liskeard in 1905. He left behind him, so Charles Greville says, a memory cherished for his delightful social qualities and a vast credit for undeveloped powers.

References

T Carlyle, Reminiscences (1881)
S. J. Reid, Life and Letters of the 1st Earl of Durham (1906)

External links 

 

1806 births
1848 deaths
People educated at Harrow School
Alumni of Trinity College, Cambridge
Members of the Parliament of the United Kingdom for English constituencies
Members of the Parliament of the United Kingdom for West Looe
Members of the Special Council of Lower Canada
Politicians from Cornwall
Politicians from Kolkata
UK MPs 1830–1831
UK MPs 1832–1835
UK MPs 1835–1837
UK MPs 1837–1841
UK MPs 1841–1847
UK MPs 1847–1852
Burials at Kensal Green Cemetery
British reformers
Charles
Members of the Parliament of the United Kingdom for Liskeard